The Paynton Ferry is a cable ferry in the Canadian province of Saskatchewan near Paynton, Saskatchewan.  The ferry crosses the North Saskatchewan River, as part of  Grid Road 674.

The six-car ferry is operated by the Saskatchewan Ministry of Highways and Infrastructure. The ferry is free of tolls and operates between 7:00 am and midnight, during the ice-free season.

The ferry handles approximately 30,000 vehicles a year.

See also 
 List of crossings of the North Saskatchewan River

References 

Ferries of Saskatchewan
Cable ferries in Canada
Paynton No. 470, Saskatchewan
Turtle River No. 469, Saskatchewan